Pignone (locally ) is a comune (municipality) in the Province of La Spezia in the Italian region Liguria, located about  southeast of Genoa and about  northwest of La Spezia.

The municipality of Pignone contains the frazione (subdivision) Casale.

Pignone borders the following municipalities: Beverino, Borghetto di Vara, Levanto, Monterosso al Mare, Vernazza.

Demographic evolution

References

Cities and towns in Liguria